Jia Ting'an (born September 3, 1952) is a retired general in the Chinese People's Liberation Army. He served as the deputy director of the Political Work Department. He was a principal aide to Jiang Zemin, former General Secretary of the Chinese Communist Party (paramount leader).

Career
Jia was born in Ye County, Henan province. He graduated in 1973 from the Chengdu Telecommunications Engineering College, where he studied microwaves. In 1982 he joined the staff of Jiang Zemin, who was serving as Minister of Electrical Industry at the time. Later Jiang became Mayor of Shanghai, then Party Secretary. In 1989 after the Tiananmen Square protests, Jiang was promoted to General Secretary of the Chinese Communist Party and Jia joined him on his staff, serving in the Office of the General Secretary and Office of the Central Military Commission Chairman. In 1994 he became deputy head of the General Office serving the Central Military Commission (CMC). He was promoted to Major General in the same year. In 2003, he became head of the General Office of the CMC. In 2005, he was promoted to the rank of lieutenant general. In December 2007 Jia was named deputy director of the Political Work Department . In June 2011, he was promoted to general, the highest non-wartime rank in the PLA.

On January 14, 2015, Mingjing News reported that Jia may have been taken in for investigation in a corruption case, but this could not be independently verified nor were there official announcements made. 

Duowei News reported that Jia, who had no military background, rose so high in the ranks of the People's Liberation Army solely due to his patronage relationship with Jiang Zemin. An opinion piece on the website said that Jia is a 'loyal foot soldier' of Jiang who was not promoted by merit. The Chinese journal Yanhuang Chunqiu implied that Jia might be linked to the disgraced vice admiral Wang Shouye, who was sentenced to life in prison during the term of Hu Jintao for corruption.

Jia was an alternate member of the 17th Central Committee of the Chinese Communist Party (he was ranked last, because out of the elected members he received the lowest number of confirmation votes), and a full member of the 18th Central Committee.

See also
 Shanghai clique

References 

1952 births
Living people
People's Liberation Army generals from Henan
People from Pingdingshan
Members of the 18th Central Committee of the Chinese Communist Party
Alternate members of the 17th Central Committee of the Chinese Communist Party